Until 1 January 2007 Hadsten municipality was a municipality (Danish, kommune) in Aarhus County on the Jutland peninsula in central Denmark.  The municipality covered an area of 139 km², and had a total population of 11.818 (2005).  Its last mayor was Anders G. Christensen, a member of the Venstre (Liberal Party) political party. The main town and site of its municipal council was Hadsten. 

The Little River (Lilleå) runs through the former municipality, and through the center of the town of Hadsten.

Hadsten municipality ceased to exist due to Kommunalreformen ("The Municipality Reform" of 2007).  It was merged with Hammel, Hinnerup, and Hvorslev municipalities, as well as the southern part of Langå municipality to form the new Favrskov municipality.  This created a municipality with an area of 487 km² and a total population of ca. 41,596 (2005).  The new municipality belongs to Region Midtjylland ("Mid-Jutland Region").

Constructions 
 Hadsten Transmitter, one of the tallest towers in Denmark.

External links 
 Favrskov municipality's website

References  
 Municipal statistics: NetBorger Kommunefakta, delivered from KMD aka Kommunedata (Municipal Data)
 Municipal mergers and neighbors: Eniro new municipalities map

Former municipalities of Denmark